Arsaki is a rural locality (a settlement) in Slednevskoye Rural Settlement, Alexandrovsky District, Vladimir Oblast, Russia. The population was 960 as of 2010. There are 10 streets.

Geography 
Arsaki is located 24 km west of Alexandrov (the district's administrative centre) by road. Imeni Lenina is the nearest rural locality.

References 

Rural localities in Alexandrovsky District, Vladimir Oblast